The 2004 Marlboro Masters of Formula 3 was the fourteenth Masters of Formula 3 race held at Circuit Park Zandvoort on 8 August 2004. It was won by Alexandre Prémat, for ASM Formule 3.

Drivers and teams

Classification

Race

See also
 2004 Formula 3 Euro Series season
 2004 British Formula 3 season

References

Masters of Formula Three
Masters of Formula Three
Masters
Masters of Formula Three